Alan Loy McGinnis (10 November 1933 in Friendswood, Texas – 9 January 2005 in Glendale, California) was an author, Christian psychotherapist, and founder and director of the Valley Counseling Center in Glendale, California, United States. He was the minister of Grandview Presbyterian church around 1970. 
 
Today there are over 3 million copies of his books in print.  His 1979 book The Friendship Factor has sold over 1,000,000 copies and his 1985 book Bringing Out the Best in People sold over 600,000 copies.  His books have been translated into over 14 languages.

His books are characterized by a clear writing style using simple, short sentences.

He was a family therapist, corporate consultant, and speaker to television, radio, and corporate audiences.

His books include:

The Friendship Factor (1979)
Bringing Out the Best in People (1985)
Confidence (self-help-book) (1987)
The Power of Optimism (1993)
The Romance Factor
The Balanced Life

References
Obituary in the Los Angeles Times

1933 births
2005 deaths
American self-help writers
People from Friendswood, Texas
People from Glendale, California